Philipp Oswald and Mate Pavić were the defending champions, but Oswald chose not to compete. Mate Pavić partnered with Marin Draganja, but they lost in the semifinals.

Chase Buchanan and Blaž Rola won the title, defeating Marcus Daniell and Artem Sitak in the final, 4–6, 6–3, [10–4].

Seeds

Draw

Draw

References
 Main Draw

Dunlop World Challenge - Doubles
2013 Men's Doubles
2013 ATP Challenger Tour